Martin Nikolaev Raynov (born 25 April 1992) is a Bulgarian professional footballer who currently plays as a midfielder for Lokomotiv Sofia.

Club career
In February 2019, he signed a 1.5 year contract with Levski Sofia. 

On 1 July 2021, Raynov signed for the Israeli Premier League club F.C. Ashdod.

International career
In August 2016, Raynov received his first call up to the senior Bulgaria squad for a 2018 FIFA World Cup qualifier against Luxembourg, and earned his first senior cap on 10 October, coming on as a substitute for Simeon Slavchev in a 3–0 loss in a World Cup qualifier against Sweden at Friends Arena in Solna.

International stats

Honours
Beroe
Bulgarian Cup: 2012–13
Bulgarian Supercup: 2013

References

External links
 
Profile at LevskiSofia.info

1992 births
Living people
Bulgarian footballers
Bulgaria under-21 international footballers
Bulgaria international footballers
PFC Beroe Stara Zagora players
FC Etar 1924 Veliko Tarnovo players
OFC Sliven 2000 players
FC Bansko players
FC Haskovo players
FC Lokomotiv Gorna Oryahovitsa players
PFC Lokomotiv Plovdiv players
PFC Levski Sofia players
F.C. Ashdod players
FC Argeș Pitești players
First Professional Football League (Bulgaria) players
Israeli Premier League players
Liga I players
FC Lokomotiv 1929 Sofia players
Bulgarian expatriate footballers
Expatriate footballers in Israel
Expatriate footballers in Romania
Bulgarian expatriate sportspeople in Israel
Bulgarian expatriate sportspeople in Romania
Association football midfielders
People from Gabrovo